The Night at the Hotel (French: Une nuit à l'hôtel) is a 1932 French drama film directed by Leo Mittler and starring Marcelle Romée, Jean Périer and Betty Stockfeld. It was made at the Joinville Studios in Paris by the French subsidiary of Paramount Pictures.

Cast
 Marcelle Romée as Marion Barnes  
 Jean Périer as Le colonel Cartier  
 Betty Stockfeld as Jennifer  
 Maurice Lagrenée as Fred  
 Lise Jaux as Mme. Cartier  
 Yvonne Hébert as Louise  
 Willy Rozier as Emmanuel  
 Magdeleine Bérubet as Aimée, la violoniste 
 Vera Baranovskaya as La Russe désabusée  
 Marcel Carpentier 
 Hubert Daix as Le docteur 
 Marcel Dalio as Jérôme  
 Henry Harment as Le docteur  
 Marcel Loche
 Jeannie Luxeuil 
 Marcel Vallée as Le portier  
 Ludmilla Yacowleff as Colette

References

Bibliography 
 Dayna Oscherwitz & MaryEllen Higgins. The A to Z of French Cinema. Scarecrow Press, 2009.

External links 
 

1932 films
French drama films
1932 drama films
1930s French-language films
Films directed by Leo Mittler
Paramount Pictures films
Films shot at Joinville Studios
French black-and-white films
1930s French films